Holidays with Pay is a 1948 British comedy film directed by John E. Blakeley and starring Frank Randle, Tessie O'Shea and Dan Young. The film follows the Rogers family as they go on holiday to Blackpool and enjoy a series of adventures.

Plot
The Rogers family visit Blackpool for their annual holidays, and have difficulty finding rooms; but are befriended by a wealthy young man who takes them to stay in his haunted mansion. The family become entangled in a plot by the young man's grasping cousin to murder him for the family inheritance. However, all ends happily with the young man marrying the Rogers eldest daughter, Pamela.

Cast
 Frank Randle - Jack Rogers
 Tessie O'Shea - Pansy Rogers
 Dan Young - Phil Rogers
 Josef Locke - Himself
 Sally Barnes - Pamela Rogers
 Sonny Burke - Michael Sandford
 Bert Tracy - Ephraim Rogers
 Joyanne Bracewell - Joyanne Rogers

Critical reception
The Spinning Image wrote: "The film as a whole is more cheap than cheerful. What makes it worthwhile is seeing the energy of Randle when he is allowed free-rein. He must have been able to work a theatre audience brilliantly by the flash of an eye or a knowing grin. It's a great pity that his performances haven't been better preserved for posterity (we have only one sound recording of him working live in 1938)."

Bibliography
 Murphy, Robert. Realism and Tinsel: Cinema and Society in Britain 1939-49. Routledge, 1989.

References

External links

1948 films
British comedy films
1948 comedy films
Films directed by John E. Blakeley
Films set in Blackpool
Films shot in England
British black-and-white films
Films shot in Greater Manchester
1940s English-language films
1940s British films